Ayton may refer to:

Places
 Ayton, Ontario, Canada
 Ayton, Scottish Borders, Scotland

England
 Great Ayton, a village and civil parish, Hambleton district, North Yorkshire
 Little Ayton, a village and civil parish, Hambleton district, North Yorkshire
 East Ayton, a village and civil parish, Scarborough district, North Yorkshire
 West Ayton, a village and civil parish, Scarborough district, North Yorkshire

Other uses
 Ayton (surname), a surname (including a list of people with the surname)

See also
 Aiton (disambiguation)
 Ayten (disambiguation)
 Aytoun, a surname